Adolf Rösti (born 30 August 1947 in Bern, Switzerland) is a Swiss former alpine skier who competed in the 1972 Winter Olympics.

External links
 sports-reference.com
 

1947 births
Living people
Swiss male alpine skiers
Olympic alpine skiers of Switzerland
Alpine skiers at the 1972 Winter Olympics
Sportspeople from Bern
20th-century Swiss people